Kärkna Abbey (or Valkenau), now ruined, was a former Cistercian monastery in Estonia.

Situation 
The monastery was sited about 8 km north of Tartu (formerly Dorpat) in the village of Lammiku near the point where the Amme River flows into the Emajõgi River.

History 
The monastery was founded before 1233 by the Bishop of Dorpat, Hermann von Buxhoeveden, and settled by monks from Pforta Abbey, of the filiation of Morimond. An early destruction by heathen inhabitants of the district is mentioned in 1234. After attacks by Russian forces from the principality of Vladimir-Suzdal and the Novgorod Republic it was rebuilt in about 1240 as a fortress surrounded by a moat and a rectangular granite wall. In 1305 it was placed under Stolpe Abbey on the Peene in Pomerania, which had joined the Cistercian order the previous year. In August 1558 the monastery was destroyed at the beginning of the Livonian War. There are remains of the foundations and of the perimeter walls.

Buildings 

The rectangular church was about 47 metres long, and consisted of a single nave of five vaulted bays. Unusually for a Cistercian church it also had a crypt of 10 bays containing two aisles, which was used not only as a place of burial but also as a place of shelter during hostilities. To the south of the church were attached the conventual buildings in the usual form of three ranges arranged in a square round a cloister and a central courtyard, with the chapter house in the east range.

List of abbots
 P. - 1234
 Godefridus - 1253
 B. - 1264
 Winandus - 1277–1288
 Daniel - 1295–1298
 Johannes de Hapsele - before 1304
 Dithmarus - 1304–1308
 Hermannus - 1327–1336
 Everhardus - 1346
 Johannes - 1354
 Albertus - 1388–1397
 Bertoldus - 1411–1433
 Gotfrid Mäke - 1462–1466
 Johannes - 1484
 Lambert - 1504–1525
 Christoph Hogenstein - 1528–1535
 Gerardus - 1538–1540
 Hermann Wesel - 1544–1558 (also Bishop of Dorpat from 1554)

See also
 List of Christian religious houses in Estonia

References 
 Dimier, M.-Anselme, 1971: L'art cistercien hors de France, p. 49, with plan. La Pierre-qui-Vire: Zodiaque
 Schneider, Ambrosius, 1986: Lexikale Übersicht der Männerklöster der Cistercienser im deutschen Sprach- und Kulturraum, in: Schneider, Ambrosius; Wienand, Adam; Bickel, Wolfgang; Coester, Ernst (eds): Die Cistercienser, Geschichte – Geist – Kunst (3rd edn), p. 654. Cologne: Wienand Verlag 
 Tuulse, A., 1942: Die Burgen in Estland und Lettland, pp. 270-274. Dorpat

Cistercian monasteries in Estonia
Christian monasteries established in the 13th century
Tartu Parish
Buildings and structures in Tartu County
Ruins in Estonia
1558 disestablishments